Déborah Lizeth Rodríguez Guelmo (born December 2, 1992 in Montevideo) is a Uruguayan athlete  and fashion model. She is also the twin sister of football player Ángel Rodríguez of River Plate Montevideo.

Athletic Career 2008 - Present 
At the 2010 South American Under-23 Championships in Athletics, she won a silver medal in the Women's 400m hurdles event, and also won two golds in the same event at the 2008 and 2011 South American Junior Championships in Athletics. Rodríguez also won bronze at the 2011 Pan American Junior Athletics Championships. She competed in the Women's 400m hurdles event at the 2012 Summer Olympics but ranked 28th and was eliminated in the first round even though she broke the national Women's 400m hurdles record (57.04 seconds), which Rodríguez previously held in 2011 with 58.63.  She also holds the national record at 400 metres-52.53 and 800 metres-2:01.46.

Personal bests

Modeling Ventures 2013 - Present 

In January, 2013 Rodríguez was signed into a modeling agency by Fernando Cristino called Cristino Management.

Achievements in athletics

References

External links

Living people
1992 births
Afro-Uruguayan
Sportspeople from Montevideo
Olympic athletes of Uruguay
Uruguayan female hurdlers
Uruguayan female models
Athletes (track and field) at the 2012 Summer Olympics
Athletes (track and field) at the 2016 Summer Olympics
Athletes (track and field) at the 2020 Summer Olympics
Athletes (track and field) at the 2011 Pan American Games
Athletes (track and field) at the 2015 Pan American Games
Athletes (track and field) at the 2019 Pan American Games
Pan American Games bronze medalists for Uruguay
Pan American Games medalists in athletics (track and field)
World Athletics Championships athletes for Uruguay
Athletes (track and field) at the 2018 South American Games
South American Games gold medalists for Uruguay
South American Games silver medalists for Uruguay
South American Games medalists in athletics
South American Championships in Athletics winners
Medalists at the 2015 Pan American Games
Medalists at the 2019 Pan American Games
South American Games gold medalists in athletics